Mary M. Hagan-Harrell is a former American Democrat politician from Ferguson, Missouri, who served in the Missouri House of Representatives.

Born in Cape Girardeau, Missouri, she attended Chaffee High School and graduated from Southeast Missouri State University with a bachelor's degree in education and from George Peabody University, now part of Vanderbilt University, in Nashville with a master's degree in legal studies.  She previously worked as teacher and librarian for the Riverview Gardens School District from 1960 until 1986.  Her husband Stanley A. Harrell who worked for McDonnell-Douglas Aircraft died in 2013.

References

20th-century American politicians
21st-century American politicians
Democratic Party members of the Missouri House of Representatives
People from Cape Girardeau, Missouri
Living people
Women state legislators in Missouri
Year of birth missing (living people)
21st-century American women politicians
20th-century American women politicians